The Old Mill (Shenton's Mill) is a restored tower mill located on Mill Point in South Perth, Western Australia. Today, restored to its original 1830s condition, it is one of Perth's best known historic landmarks and serves as a sightseeing attraction.

History
The windmill was commissioned by William Kernot Shenton, on a foundation stone laid by Governor James Stirling in 1835. The original mill, the colony's first wind-powered industry, was built by Paul and James Lockyer and operated by William Steele. Operation ceased in 1859, due to unprofitability and the unsuitable location. The four ton cogwheels were hewn from a nearby tree known as tuart, the highly valued species Eucalyptus gomphocephala.

The site was located near the earliest housing and agriculture of the colony, and was used for industry  before being adapted to commercial, then residential, purposes. In 1880, an engineer known as "Satan" Browne established a dance hall and hotel known as Alta Gardens. The alterations by Browne remained, although the venture was a failure, and it found use as a chicken run and house instead. The address of the site is now listed as Mill Point Road, South Perth.

In 1957, the proposed route of the Narrows Bridge was deviated to preserve the site, after a campaign by public officials, and a folk museum was established on the grounds.

The site was received by the City of South Perth, repaired and upgraded and was placed on the register of the National Trust in 1992. The buildings and site is noted as having permanent entry on heritage registers for its architectural and historical significance, and conservation "... for their own sake, and as a museum, is important".

References

Further reading 
Cec Florey. Peninsular City: A Social History of the City of South Perth.

External links

 

Landmarks in Perth, Western Australia
Tower mills
Windmills in Australia
Windmills completed in 1835
Museums in Perth, Western Australia
Mill museums in Australia
South Perth, Western Australia
State Register of Heritage Places in the City of South Perth